Northern Region may refer to:
Northern Region, Ghana
Northern Region, Eastern Cape, South Africa
Northern Region, Malawi
Northern Region, Malta
Northern Region, Manitoba, Canada, a region situated on the Canadian Shield including Manitoba's Hudson Bay coastline
Northern Region, Nigeria (former)
Northern Region (Sydney), alternative name for the northern suburb of Sydney in Australia
Northern Region, Uganda
AAA Northern Region, a sports league of large high schools in Virginia
Northern Region Film and Television Archive, an English organisation

North or Nord Region may refer to :
Nord Region, Burkina Faso
North Region, Brazil, an official grouping of states for economic and statistical purposes
North Region, Cameroon
North Region, Singapore

See also
Central Region (disambiguation)
Eastern Region (disambiguation)
Southern Region (disambiguation)
Western Region (disambiguation)